Timothy Henry Weeks Passmore (born October 1959) is the Conservative Suffolk Police and Crime Commissioner. He is the first person to hold the post and was elected on 15 November 2012, and re-elected twice on 6 May 2016 and 8 May 2021. 

Passmore was educated at Ipswich School in Ipswich, Suffolk.

References

http://www.eadt.co.uk/business/new_boss_for_choose_suffolk_partnership_1_731760

Police and crime commissioners in England
Living people
1959 births
People educated at Ipswich School
Conservative Party police and crime commissioners